Super Monkey Ball is a series of arcade platform video games initially developed by Amusement Vision and published by Sega. The series debuted in 2001 with the arcade game Monkey Ball, which was ported to GameCube as Super Monkey Ball later that year. Several sequels and ports have been released.

Games

Monkey Ball (arcade) (June 23, 2001)
Super Monkey Ball (GameCube) (September 14, 2001)
Super Monkey Ball 2 (GameCube) (August 25, 2002)
Super Monkey Ball Jr. (Game Boy Advance) (November 19, 2002)
Super Monkey Ball (N-Gage) (October 7, 2003)
Super Monkey Ball Deluxe (PlayStation 2 and Xbox) (March 15, 2005)
Super Monkey Ball: Touch & Roll (Nintendo DS) (December 1, 2005)
Super Monkey Ball Adventure (PlayStation 2, GameCube, PlayStation Portable) (June 30, 2006)
Super Monkey Ball: Banana Blitz (Wii) (November 19, 2006)
Super Monkey Ball: Tip 'n Tilt (J2ME) (2007)
Super Monkey Ball (iOS, Windows Phone) (July 10, 2008 for iOS, March 18, 2011 for Windows Phone)
Super Monkey Ball: Tip 'n Tilt 2 (J2ME) (2008)
Super Monkey Ball 2 (IOS) (2009)
Super Monkey Ball 2: Sakura Edition (IOS, Android, Windows Phone) (2010, rereleased 2018 for android)
Super Monkey Ball: Step & Roll (Wii) (February 9, 2010)
Super Monkey Ball: Ticket Blitz (Arcade) (2011)
Super Monkey Ball 3D (Nintendo 3DS) (March 3, 2011)
Super Monkey Ball: Banana Splitz (PlayStation Vita) (June 14, 2012)
Super Monkey Ball Bounce (Android, iOS) (2014)
Super Monkey Ball: Banana Blitz HD (PC, Nintendo Switch, PlayStation 4, Xbox One) (October 29, 2019 for Nintendo Switch, PlayStation 4, and Xbox One, December 10, 2019 for PC)
Super Monkey Ball Banana Mania (PC, Nintendo Switch, PlayStation 4, PlayStation 5, Xbox One, Xbox Series X/S) (October 5, 2021) (May 12, 2022 for Amazon Luna)

Gameplay
As opposed to normal games where the player takes control of the character itself, Super Monkey Ball has the player move their character around in a gachapon ball by tilting the world itself (the exception of this being Super Monkey Ball Adventure). By tilting the board at various angles, players can control the speed and turning of the character. The goal of each level is to reach the goal gate before the timer runs out, and without falling off the floor. Bonus points and extra lives can be earned by collecting bananas on the stage. Early games use traditional controllers to play while many recent titles utilize modern technology, such as the accelerometers of the Wii and iPhone titles. The gameplay is similar to Atari Games' 1984 arcade video game Marble Madness.

Characters

The original Monkey Ball arcade cabinet featured three playable characters: AiAi, MeeMee, and Baby; a fourth, GonGon, was added in the game's GameCube port, Super Monkey Ball. These four have become the primary characters of the series, appearing in every subsequent title to date. Two new characters, YanYan and Doctor, were introduced in Super Monkey Ball: Banana Blitz, while another two, Jam and Jet, first appeared in Super Monkey Ball: Step & Roll and Super Monkey Ball 3D, respectively. Several games feature unlockable variations of these characters wearing alternate costumes, along with occasional guest playable characters such as Sonic the Hedgehog. Some games such as Super Monkey Ball 2 and Super Monkey Ball Adventure have also featured various non-player characters, such as the villainous Dr. Bad-Boon.

Characters from the Super Monkey Ball series have been featured in other Sega titles. Aiai has appeared as a playable character in Sonic Riders and Sonic & Sega All-Stars Racing, while both AiAi and MeeMee make playable appearances in Sega Superstars Tennis and Sonic & All-Stars Racing Transformed. Aiai was also featured in Archie Comics' adaptation of Sonic & All-Stars Racing Transformed in issue #45 of Sonic Universe.

Legacy 
As of December 8, 2006, the franchise has sold 4 million copies. 

A 2006 study conducted by the Beth Israel Medical Center found that surgeons who played Super Monkey Ball for 20 minutes prior to performing a surgical drill finished slightly faster and made fewer mistakes.

The iOS version in 2008 was one of the first games on the App Store and was the best selling app on launch day.

In 2009, Edge ranked the first Super Monkey Ball #39 on its list of "The 100 Best Games To Play Today". Writing in 1001 Video Games You Must Play Before You Die, Christian Donlan described Super Monkey Ball as "one of Sega's grade-A triumphs". An enhanced engine of the GameCube games was used in F-Zero GX, which was critically acclaimed and Nintendo considered a step forward for the franchise. The developers of Super Monkey Ball went on to make the Like a Dragon series.

When commenting on the differences of the franchise between the GameCube games and the Wii entries with Banana Blitz and Step & Roll in a Tokyo Game Show 2009 interview, Toshihiro Nagoshi stated that they were made easier for kids and families. However, he stated that if they got the chance, they definitely would like to go back and make a game in the style of the old games that particularly the fans overseas want. Due to the older demographic of the PlayStation Vita, the difficulty for Super Monkey Ball: Banana Splitz was made more on par with the GameCube entries.

The 2020 battle royale game Fall Guys: Ultimate Knockout has been described as "Super Monkey Ball for the Fortnite generation" by Tom Wiggins of Stuff magazine.

References 

 
Sega Games franchises
Video game franchises introduced in 2001